Narara railway station is located on the Main Northern line in New South Wales, Australia. It serves the northern Central Coast suburb of Narara opening on 15 August 1887.

Platforms & services
Narara has two side platforms. It is serviced by NSW TrainLink Central Coast & Newcastle Line services travelling from Sydney Central to Newcastle. Peak-hour services travel from Central to Wyong via the North Shore line.

Transport links
Busways operate two routes via Narara station:
36: Gosford station to Westfield Tuggerah via Narara
37: Gosford station to Westfield Tuggerah via Wyoming

References

External links

Narara station details Transport for New South Wales

Transport on the Central Coast (New South Wales)
Railway stations in Australia opened in 1887
Regional railway stations in New South Wales
Short-platform railway stations in New South Wales, 4 cars
Main North railway line, New South Wales